Sangun or Senagun may refer to:
 Senagun, Kohgiluyeh and Boyer-Ahmad
 Sangun, Razavi Khorasan
 Sangun, Sistan and Baluchestan